Menno is a city in Hutchinson County, South Dakota, United States. The population was 614 at the 2020 census.

Menno was laid out in 1879.

Geography
Menno is located at  (43.237840, -97.577440).

Menno has been assigned the ZIP code 57045 and the FIPS place code 41980.

Demographics

2010 census
As of the census of 2010, there were 608 people, 285 households, and 173 families residing in the city. The racial makeup of the city was 98.7% White, 0.5% Native American, and 0.8% from two or more races. Hispanic or Latino of any race were 0.8% of the population.

There were 285 households, of which 17.5% had children under the age of 18 living with them, 54.4% were married couples living together, 4.2% had a female householder with no husband present, 2.1% had a male householder with no wife present, and 39.3% were non-families. 37.2% of all households were made up of individuals, and 21.4% had someone living alone who was 65 years of age or older. The average household size was 1.96 and the average family size was 2.53.

The median age in the city was 57.1 years. 15% of residents were under the age of 18; 3.9% were between the ages of 18 and 24; 14.3% were from 25 to 44; 26.5% were from 45 to 64; and 40.3% were 65 years of age or older. The gender makeup of the city was 46.2% male and 53.8% female.

2000 census
As of the census of 2000, there were 729 people, 317 households, and 199 families residing in the city. The population density was 1,435.8 people per square mile (551.9/km2). There were 358 housing units at an average density of 705.1 per square mile (271.0/km2). The racial makeup of the city was 98.77% White, 0.14% African American, 0.41% Native American, and 0.69% from two or more races.

There were 317 homes out of which 22.1% had children under the age of 18 living with them, 56.2% were married couples living together, 4.4% had a female householder with no husband present, and 37.2% were non-families. 35.3% of all households were made up of individuals, and 25.2% had someone living alone who was 65 years of age or older. The average household size was 2.15 and the average family size was 2.77.

In the city, the population was spread out, with 20.3% under the age of 18, 4.0% from 18 to 24, 18.1% from 25 to 44, 17.8% from 45 to 64, and 39.8% who were 65 years of age or older. The median age was 52 years. For every 100 females, there were 90.8 males. For every 100 females age 18 and over, there were 81.0 males.

The median income for a household in the city was $26,750, and the median income for a family was $38,125. Males had a median income of $23,194 versus $18,750 for females. The per capita income for the city was $14,668. About 7.7% of families and 9.0% of the population were below the poverty line, including 7.8% of those under age 18 and 11.4% of those age 65 or over.

Climate
Humid continental climate is a climatic region typified by large seasonal temperature differences, with warm to hot (and often humid) summers and cold (sometimes severely cold) winters. Precipitation is relatively well distributed year-round in many areas with this climate.  The Köppen Climate Classification subtype for this climate is "Dfa". (Hot Summer Continental Climate).

References

External links
 City of Menno

Cities in South Dakota
Cities in Hutchinson County, South Dakota